Callendar is a title of Scottish nobility and a surname. It may refer to:

 Earl of Callendar
 Callendar House, Falkirk
 Guy Stewart Callendar (1898 – 1964), English steam engineer and inventor and son of Hugh Longbourne Callendar
 Callendar effect
 Hugh Longbourne Callendar (1863 – 1930), British physicist and father of Guy Stewart Callendar

See also

 Calendar - (chronological system or book)
 Calender - (roller system)
 Callander - (Town in Scotland)
 Callender (disambiguation)
 Colander (kitchen utensil)
 Qalandar (disambiguation)